Veikko Asikainen (18 April 1918 – 14 June 2002) was a Finnish footballer. He earned 56 caps at international level between 1938 and 1955. He was also part of Finland's squad at the 1952 Summer Olympics. At club level Asikainen played for TPS and Haka.

Honours
Finnish Championship: 1939, 1941
Finnish Cup: 1955

References

External links

1918 births
2002 deaths
Finnish footballers
Finland international footballers
Turun Palloseura footballers
FC Haka players
Footballers from Turku
Olympic footballers of Finland
Footballers at the 1952 Summer Olympics
Association football midfielders